Quşçu is a village and municipality in the Goygol District of Azerbaijan. It has a population of 418. The village had an Armenian majority prior to the First Nagorno-Karabakh War and Operation Ring.

References

External links 
 

Populated places in Goygol District
Former Armenian inhabited settlements